Riders in the Sky is an American Western music and comedy group which began performing in 1977. The band has released more than 40 full length albums, starred in a self-titled television series on CBS lasting two seasons, wrote and starred in an NPR syndicated radio drama Riders Radio Theater, and appeared in television series and films including as featured contributors to Ken Burns' Country Music.
Their family-friendly style also appeals to children, exemplified in their recordings for Disney and Pixar. They have won two Grammy Awards and have written and performed music for major motion pictures, including "Woody's Roundup" from Toy Story 2 and Pixar's short film, For the Birds.  The band also recorded full length companion albums for Toy Story 2 and Monsters, Inc.

History

Early years (1977–1979) 
The Riders first performed on November 11, 1977 at Herr Harry's Frank N' Steins in Nashville, TN. For this first performance, the Riders consisted of Deputy Doug (Douglas B. Green), Windy Bill Collins, and Fred LaBour. Happy with the crowds reaction, the Riders performed for the second time at Herr Harry's the next evening. Between the second and third performances, the band still didn't have a name, but that changed in December 1977, when Fred LaBour found a copy of The Sons of The Pioneers album Riders in the Sky. When LaBour saw the album, he immediately called Green and told him that Riders In The Sky should be the band's name. Green agreed and from their third performance on, they were officially billed as Riders In The Sky. In 1978, Bill Collins left the Riders shortly after "Tumbleweed Tommy" Goldsmith joined. Shortly after Collins left, "Woody Paul" Chrisman also joined the band. In mid-1979, Tommy Goldsmith left the Riders shortly before the recording of their first album, which would become Three on the Trail, though Goldsmith would perform on the album, but not as a member of the Riders.

Rise in popularity (1980–1989)

Induction into the Grand Ole Opry (1982) 
In 1982, Doug Green wrote a letter to Hal Durham, manager of the Grand Ole Opry, telling him the Riders would like to join. Durham responded favorably; western music was under-represented in the Opry, and it wouldn't conflict with the other materials and performances already in the Opry. After 26 appearances as a guest act, the Riders were officially inducted into the Opry on June 19, 1982.

Tumbleweed Theater (1983–1988) 

In late 1982, the Riders were approached by Steve Arwood and Randy Hale to host a television show on The Nashville Network (which had not begun broadcasting yet) called Tumbleweed Theater. The premise of the show was that their 90-minute program would show heavily edited public domain "B-Westerns" of the 1930s and 40s with Riders In The Sky performing skits and songs before, in between, and after the films. After screening the movie that would be featured in the episode, Arwood and Fred LaBour wrote the sketches that played between the films, with many of the skits carrying over to the Riders' live shows and albums. Tumbleweed Theater premiered March 7, 1983, the same day TNN began broadcasting and continued for five seasons overall, the last two consisting of repackaged skits and songs.

Sweet Dreams (1985) 
In late 1983, the Riders made their Hollywood debut when the trio landed parts in Sweet Dreams, a biographical film about the life of Patsy Cline. The Riders played The Jordanaires, although in the film they are never mentioned by name.

Riders Radio Theater (1988–1995) 

Beginning in 1988, Riders In The Sky were the stars of Riders Radio Theater, a weekly radio show written by Fred LaBour and Steve Arwood (now going by the stagename Texas Bix Bender) that was essentially the Tumbleweed Theater television show minus the "B-Western" films. The half-hour show was taped at the Tennessee Performing Arts Center in Nashville, but later moved to Cincinnati, Ohio. The weekly show was canceled in 1995, but later came back as occasional specials beginning in 1998.

1990–present

CBS Children's show (1991) 

In 1990, CBS approached the Riders to do a Saturday morning television show that would later be described as "Pee-Wee's Playhouse meets the wild west". Only airing for one season (a total of 13 episodes) due to low ratings and weekly schedule changes, the show was written by George McGrath instead of the Riders themselves. Fred LaBour reflected on the show, saying "Everything we've had a hand in writing had been a success, we didn't have a hand in that, and it wasn't." The show premiered on September 14, 1991 as Riders In The Sky (although it has also been referred to as Saturday Mornings With Riders In The Sky).

Toy Story 2 and Grammys (1998–2002) 
In 1998, Ash Brannon recommended to Disney and Pixar executives that Riders In The Sky be the performers of "Woody's Round-Up" for their upcoming film Toy Story 2. The executives were so impressed with the Riders' performance, they had the Riders create a tie-in album around the characters of Toy Story 2 called Woody's Roundup: A Rootin' Tootin' Collection of Woody's Favorite Songs. The album won the Grammy Award for Best Musical Album for Children at the Grammy Awards of 2001.

After the success of the Woody's Round-Up album, the Riders were called back into Pixar in 2002 to do another tie-in album, except based on Pixar's latest film: Monsters, Inc. The album, titled Monsters, Inc. Scream Factory Favorites, won the Riders a second Grammy Award for Best Musical Album for Children at the Grammy Awards of 2003.

In animated form (2003–2015) 
The Riders made their animated debut in 2003, in the Warner Bros. animated series Duck Dodgers, where they played a robot band modeled after themselves. Their second animated appearance was in Disney's direct-to-DVD animated adventure children's film titled Stanley's Dinosaur Round-Up. Their most recent animated role was in the Kickstarter-funded film Cartoon Cowboys by WonderVista Studios. Cartoon Cowboys borrows heavily from Riders Radio Theater, including characters from the show and the Riders having the same personalities as their radio counterparts.

YellaWood spokesmen (2009) 
The Riders appeared as musical spokesmen in a series of YellaWood commercials, which re-united the Riders with Steve Arwood (once again playing Texas Bix Bender) and featured a set similar to the one seen on Tumbleweed Theater (complete with a blue Studebaker pickup truck and the Riders performing on a Bunkhouse porch). The Riders also performed the theme song for YellaWood's The Adventures of Yella Fella and make cameos in the first episodes of seasons one and two.

Hiatus (2019–2021) 
The Riders in the Sky went on an extended hiatus during the COVID-19 pandemic in 2020, in part because of Miskulin having extended health issues that prevented him from playing. The remaining members declined to make any of their usual Opry appearances during the pandemic; only Ranger Doug continued with any cowboy-related projects during the hiatus. The band reunited in 2021. , they perform on the Grand Ole Opry several times per month.

Members

Current 
 "Ranger Doug" Green – guitar, vocals (since 1977)
 Too Slim (Fred LaBour) – bass, vocals (since 1977)
 "Woody Paul" Chrisman – fiddle, vocals (since 1978)
 Joey Miskulin, the Cow-Polka King – accordion, vocals (started performing with the Riders in 1988, but didn't become an official member until the early 1990s)

Former 
 "Windy Bill" Collins – guitar, vocals (1977–1978)
 "Tumbleweed Tommy" Goldsmith – guitar, vocals (1978–1979)

Awards

Riders in the Sky were named Western Music Group of the Year during the Academy of Western Artists 2006 Will Rogers Awards.
 Cowboy Jubilee
 This CD was featured on The New York Times' Best Ten List for 1982.
 Best Independent Country Album of the Year
 Saddle Pals
 Best Independent Children's Album of the Year
 Always Drink Upstream from the Herd
 1995 Cowboy Hall of Fame Wrangler Award for Outstanding Western Recording!
 Woody's Roundup: A Rootin' Tootin' Collection of Woody's Favorite Songs
 2001 Grammy Award Winner: "Best Musical Album For Children"
 Monsters, Inc. Scream Factory Favorites
 2003 Grammy Award Winner: "Best Musical Album For Children"

Discography

Notable filmography

Books

References

External links 
 
 

Country music groups from Tennessee
Grammy Award winners
Grand Ole Opry members
Western swing musical groups
Rounder Records artists
MCA Records artists
CBS Records artists
Rykodisc artists
Epic Records artists
Vocal quartets
Walt Disney Records artists